This is a list of the people, companies or websites that won the annual Webby Awards presented by the International Academy of Digital Arts and Sciences. The Webby Awards have been dubbed the "internet's highest honor".

1997

1997 was the first year of the annual Webby Award event, which was the first-ever nationally televised awards ceremony devoted to the Internet. 700 people attended the event on March 6, 1997 at Bimbo's Night Club in San Francisco, California  Whereas in later years the panelists were official members of International Academy of Digital Arts and Sciences, in 1997 the awards were chosen and given by IDG's The Web Magazine, which appointed a panel to judge the competition.

1998

The 1998 Webby Awards were held on March 6, 1998 at the San Francisco Palace of Fine Arts, and were the first event ever to be broadcast live via the Web in 3D.  The "People's Voice" awards, chosen by online poll, received 100,000 cumulative votes that year. The 1998 awards were sponsored by PC World Communications, the San Francisco Chronicle and other organizations. ABC News was the official website to "cybercast" the awards.

The Web magazine, which was hosting the awards, was closed down by its parent company IDG shortly before the awards, and the ceremony continued thereafter under the management of Tiffany Shlain, who IDG had hired in 1996 to coordinate the awards.  The International Academy of Digital Arts and Sciences was constituted that year as the judging panel for the awards, continues to do so as of the 2007 awards.

1999

The 1999 Webby Awards were held on March 18, 1999 at the Herbst Theater (War memorial Opera House) in San Francisco, with a post-award party at City Hall.  
That year, Mayor Rudy Giuliani lobbied to move the ceremony to New York City, but San Francisco Mayor Willie Brown convinced the organization to remain in San Francisco by promising city support. Brown gave a speech at the ceremony and Marc Maron was the master of ceremonies.  The event was noted for the famous incident in which a representative of Jodi.org, which had won in the arts category, called the event participants "Ugly corporate sons-of-bitches" in his acceptance speech and tossed his trophy to the audience.  In 1999 the Webby Awards asked PricewaterhouseCoopers to help it tabulate and ensure security for the "People's Voice" winners, chosen by online voting.

2000

The 2000 awards were the first time that organization requested submissions. Previously, nominees had been selected by an internal committee. The organization gave out awards in 27 categories voted on by a 350 member judges.

2001

2002

2003

This year marked the first year the awards show was broadcast online, and it lasted 20 minutes. The organization provided 30 awards. NASA and eBay won the most honors.

2004

2005

Honorees at 9th Annual Webby Awards included:
Webby Lifetime Achievement Award: Former Vice President Al Gore in recognition of the role he played in the development of the Internet over the past three decades
Webby Person of the Year: Craig Newmark, the founder of Craigslist
Webby Artist of the Year: The Kleptones
Webby Breakout of the Year: Caterina Fake and Stewart Butterfield, the founders of Flickr

Webby Awards winners included Mercedes-Benz USA (Automotive), Google (Best Practices), Merck (Health), and Skype (Telecommunications).

2006

Honorees at 10th Annual Webby Awards included:
 Webby Breakout of the Year:  MySpace.com and its founders Tom Anderson and Chris DeWolfe
 Webby Artist of the Year: Gorillaz
 Webby Entrepreneur of the Year: Mark Cuban, owner of the Dallas Mavericks and HDNet
 Webby Person of the Year: Thomas Friedman, New York Times columnist and Pulitzer Prize-winning author of The World is Flat: A Brief History of The 21st Century
 Webby Lifetime Achievement Award: Dr. Robert Kahn, co-inventor of the TCP/IP protocols, the technology used to transmit information on today's Internet
 Webby Lifetime Achievement Award: Prince, for "visionary" use of the internet, and being the first major artist to release an album over the internet, Crystal Ball.

2007

Honorees at 11th Annual Webby Awards included:
 Webby Lifetime Achievement: David Bowie was honored for his career which has pushed the boundaries of art and technology – from Ziggy Stardust to BowieNet, the Internet service provider he launched in 1998, to BowieArt, a Web site that connects the new visual artists with art collectors worldwide.
 Webby Lifetime Achievement: eBay President and CEO Meg Whitman accepted the award on behalf of the 150 million registered eBay buyers and sellers
 Webby People of the Year: YouTube Co-Founders Steve Chen and Chad Hurley
 Webby Artist of the Year: Beastie Boys were recognized for their 2006 concert film, "Awesome, I Fucking Shot That", which was filmed entirely by dozens of audience members using hand-held cameras provided by the group.
 Two Special Achievement Awards for Acting were presented at the 1st Annual Webby Film and Video Awards:
 Best Actor: "Ninja", the star of the online comedy series "Ask a Ninja"
 Best Actress: Jessica Rose, star of the fictional video diary "lonelygirl15"

2008

The 2008 Webby Awards took place on June 11, 2008 at the Citriani Restaurant event space on Wall Street in New York City.
Honorees at 12th Annual Webby Awards included:
 Webby Lifetime Achievement: David Byrne
 Webby Artist of the Year: will.i.am
 Webby Person of the Year: Stephen Colbert
 Webby Film & Video Lifetime Achievement: Lorne Michaels
 Webby Film & Video Awards Person of the Year: Michel Gondry
 Webby Film & Video Awards Best Actor: Tim and Eric

2009

Winners were honored at a ceremony hosted by Seth Meyers in New York City on June 8.

 Webby Artist of the Year: Trent Reznor
 Webby Person of the Year: Jimmy Fallon
 Webby Breakout of the Year: Twitter
 Best Actress: Sarah Silverman
 Outstanding Comedic Performance: Lisa Kudrow
 Film & Video Person of the Year: Seth MacFarlane

2010

Honorees at 14th Annual Webby Awards included:
Web documentary (individual episode): Jam 3 Media/National Film Board of Canada (Waterlife)

2011

Winners were honored at a ceremony hosted by Lisa Kudrow in New York City on June 13 at the Hammerstein Ballroom.

 Webby for Best Drama in the Webby People’s Voice Awards of the Year: Urban Wolf.
 Welcome to Pine Point received two Webbys, for Documentary: Individual Episode in the Online Film & Video category and Netart in the Websites category.
 Watson, the computer which competed on Jeopardy!, was named Person of the Year.
 Webby for Best Individual Performance of the Year: Vincent Sze in Urban Wolf

2012

Honorees at 16th Annual Webby Awards included:
 Webby for Best Real Estate Site (People's Voice): ApartmentList.com
 Webby for Artist of the Year: Björk
 Webby Person of the Year: Louis C.K.
 Webby for Experimental and Innovation (People's Voice): SwiftKey
 Webby for best use of photography: God's Lake Narrows
 Webby for best web art: Bla Bla

2013

Honorees at 17th Annual Webby Awards included:
Webby for Person of the Year: Frank Ocean
Webby for Outstanding Comedic Performance: Jerry Seinfeld
Webby for Artist of the Year: Grimes (musician)
Webby for Athlete of the Year: Chris Kluwe
Webby Breakout of the Year: Obama for America Tech team
Webby Lifetime Achievement Award for inventing the GIF: Steve Wilhite
Special Achievement for Kevin Spacey and Dana Brunetti, for House of Cards (U.S. TV series)
Special Achievement for Burning Love team
People's Voice: Corridor Digital's "The Glitch"

2014

Honorees at 18th Annual Webby Awards included:
Webby for Person of the Year: Banksy
Webby for Artist of the Year: De La Soul
Webby for Athlete of the Year: Jamaican Bobsled Team
Webby Breakout of the Year: Kickstarter 
Webby Lifetime Achievement Award for co-founding Creative Commons: Lawrence Lessig
Special Achievement for Freddie Wong, for co-creating Video Game High School
Best Actress: Taylor Schilling
Webby Film & Video Person of the Year: Freddie Wong

2015

Honorees at 19th Annual Webby Awards included:
Webby Lifetime Achievement Award to Louis Rossetto and Jane Metcalfe for publishing Wired
Special Achievement to the ALS Ice Bucket Challenge
Outstanding Comedic Performance to Chelsea Peretti
Best Actress to Ellie Kemper 
Best Actor to Tituss Burgess
Breakout of the Year to Tinder
Game (Tablet & All Other Devices) to Monument Valley

2016

Honorees at 20th Annual Webby Awards included:
Webby Lifetime Achievement to The Onion for humor
Special Achievement to Lena Dunham & Jennifer Konner for Lenny Letter
Outstanding Comedic Performance to Chelsea Peretti
Best Actress to Krysten Ritter 
Artist of the Year to Kanye West
Film & Video Breakout of the Year to Making a Murderer
Best Writing to Last Week Tonight with John Oliver
Best Game to Justin Hook for Google Feud

2017

Honorees at 21st Annual Webby Awards included:
 Lifetime Achievement: Internet Archive
 Activism: Women's Footprint in History by UN Women
 Music video: Coldplay
 Best Streaming Video: HBO Now
 Games: Pokémon Go
 Music: Mark Ronson

2018

2019

2020

Notes
In keeping with the awards themselves, winners are designated according to the website winning the award, although the winner is, technically, the web design firm that created the winning site and in the case of corporate websites, the designer's client.  Web links are provided for informational purposes where the winning website or a follow-on remains available and can be found; the text used for the hyperlink is as listed on the past winner pages at https://web.archive.org/web/20081208183958/http://www.webbyawards.com/webbys/winners-1997.php and so on.  Many older websites, however, no longer exist or are redirected to replacements and are so noted.

References

Internet film festivals
Webby Award
 List